Eastern Suburbs (now known as the Sydney Roosters) finished as runners up in the 26th New South Wales Rugby League(NSWRL) premiership in the 1934 season.

Details

Lineup: - Cyril Abotomey, Jack Beaton, Dave Brown(c), Frank Buchanan, John Clarke, Jack 'Buster' Craigie, Tom Dowling, T. Lang,  J. Lane, Tom McLachlan, Max Nixon, Ernie Norman, Andy Norval, Joe Pearce, Henry 'Harry' Pierce, Ray Stehr, Viv Thicknesse, H. Thompson.

Ladder

Season summary
Eastern Suburbs were minor premiers and finished the season as runners up.
 Dave Brown was the New South Wales Rugby League(NSWRL)'s leading point scorer for the 1934 season.
 Dave Brown was the NSWRFL (equal) leading Try scorer in 1934 with 11 tries.

References

External links
 Rugby League Tables and Statistics

Sydney Roosters seasons
East